The Curious Case of Benjamin Button is a 2008 American fantasy romantic drama film directed by David Fincher. The storyline by Eric Roth and Robin Swicord is loosely based on the 1922 short story of the same name by F. Scott Fitzgerald. The film stars Brad Pitt as a man who ages in reverse and Cate Blanchett as the love interest throughout his life. The film also stars Taraji P. Henson, Mahershala Ali, Julia Ormond, Jason Flemyng, Elias Koteas, and Tilda Swinton.

Producer Ray Stark bought the film rights to do the short story in the mid-1980s with Universal Pictures backing the film, but struggled to get the project off the ground until he sold the rights to producers Kathleen Kennedy and Frank Marshall in the 1990s. Although it was moved to Paramount Pictures in the 1990s, the film did not enter production until after Fincher and Pitt signed on along with the rest of the cast in 2005. Principal photography began in November 2006 and wrapped up in September 2007. Digital Domain worked on the visual effects of the film, particularly in the process of the metamorphosis of Pitt's character.

The Curious Case of Benjamin Button was released in North America on December 25, 2008 to positive reviews from critics, who praised Fincher's directing, Pitt's performance, production values, and visual effects. The film was a box office success, grossing $335.8 million worldwide against its $167 million budget. The film received thirteen Academy Award nominations, the most of the 81st Academy Awards, including Best Picture, Best Director for Fincher, Best Actor for Pitt, and Best Supporting Actress for Taraji P. Henson, and won three, for Best Art Direction, Best Makeup, and Best Visual Effects.

Plot

In August 2005, Daisy Fuller is on her deathbed in a New Orleans hospital as Hurricane Katrina approaches. She tells her daughter Caroline, about blind clockmaker Mr. Gateau, hired to make a clock for a train station in 1918. When it was unveiled, the public was surprised to see it running backwards. She reveals that Mr. Gateau made it as a memorial for those who lost their sons in World War I, including his own son. Daisy then asks Caroline to read aloud from Benjamin Button's diary.

On the evening of November 11, 1918, a boy is born with the appearance and maladies of an elderly man. His mother, Caroline, dies soon after childbirth and his father, wealthy manufacturer Thomas Button, abandons the infant on the porch of a nursing home. Caretaker Queenie and cook Mr. Tizzy Weathers find the baby, and she raises him as her own, naming him Benjamin. As the years pass, Benjamin physically blends in with the elderly residents but has the mind and curiosities of a child. Physically aging in reverse, he eventually transitions from a wheelchair to crutches and learns to walk. He befriends a visiting African Pygmy named Oti, who teaches him to look beyond the physical, and resident Mrs. Maple, who teaches him to play the piano.

On Thanksgiving 1930, Benjamin meets seven-year-old Daisy, whose grandmother lives in the nursing home and they connect instantly. Later, he accepts work on the tugboat Chelsea captained by Mike Clark. Thomas Button introduces himself to Benjamin, but does not reveal his true identity. In autumn 1936, Benjamin leaves for a long-term work engagement with the tugboat crew and travels around the world. He sends Daisy hundreds of postcards, and learns that she was accepted into a ballet company in New York City.

In Murmansk in 1941, Benjamin becomes smitten with Elizabeth Abbott, wife of a British trade minister. Their affair eventually ends, leaving Benjamin heartbroken. That December, the United States enters World War II. Mike volunteers the Chelsea for U.S. Navy service, and they are assigned to salvage duties. They find a near sunken U.S. transport and thousands of dead American troops. The culprit, a German U-boat, surfaces and fires on the tugboat. Captain Mike rams the submarine and the resulting explosion sinks both. Most of the crew perishes except for Benjamin and Rick Brody, who are rescued the following day.

In May 1945, Benjamin returns to New Orleans, reuniting with Queenie and learns that Mr. Weathers died. He reconnects with Daisy and she attempts to seduce him but Benjamin refuses and she departs. Benjamin visits terminally-ill Thomas and learns the details of his birth and family. Thomas gives his button manufacturing company and estate to Benjamin before dying.

In 1947, Benjamin visits Daisy in New York unannounced, but departs upon seeing she is romantically involved with someone else. In 1954, Daisy's dancing career ends when her leg is crushed in an automobile accident in Paris. When Benjamin visits her, Daisy is amazed by his appearance, but, frustrated by her injuries, she tells him to stay out of her life.

In 1962, Daisy returns to New Orleans and reunites with Benjamin. Now of comparable physical age, they fall in love. Queenie dies, and Benjamin and Daisy move in together. In 1967, Daisy, who has opened a ballet studio, tells Benjamin that she is pregnant. Their daughter, Caroline, is born in the spring of 1968. Believing he cannot be a proper father due to his reverse aging, Benjamin sells his assets, leaves the money for Daisy and Caroline, and leaves to travel alone during the 1970s.

Benjamin, physically a young man, returns to Daisy in 1980. Now married, Daisy introduces him as a family friend to her husband Robert and Caroline. She admits he was right to leave; she could not have coped otherwise. She later visits him at his hotel, where they have sex and part once more. In 1990, recently widowed Daisy is contacted by social workers who found Benjamin, who is now physically a pre-teen. When she arrives, they explain that he was living in a condemned building, was taken to the hospital in poor physical condition, and that his diary had her name on it. Benjamin displays early signs of dementia, so Daisy eventually moves into the nursing home in 1997 and cares for Benjamin for the rest of his life as he regresses into infancy.

In 2002, Mr. Gateau's clock was replaced with a properly working modern digital clock and in the spring of 2003, Benjamin dies in Daisy's arms, physically an infant but chronologically over 84 years old. Back in 2005, having finally revealed that Benjamin is Caroline's father, Daisy dies. Hurricane Katrina floods a storage room holding Mr. Gateau's clock, which continues to tick backwards.

Cast

Production

Development
Producer Ray Stark bought the film rights to do The Curious Case of Benjamin Button in the mid-1980s, and it was optioned by Universal Pictures. The first choice to direct it was Frank Oz, with Martin Short attached for the title role, but Oz could not work out how to make the story work. The film was optioned in 1991 by Steven Spielberg, with Tom Cruise attached for the lead role, but Spielberg left the project to direct Jurassic Park and Schindler's List. Other directors attached were Patrick Read Johnson and Agnieszka Holland. Stark eventually sold the rights to producers Kathleen Kennedy and Frank Marshall, who took the film to Paramount Pictures, with Universal still on as a co-production partner. By summer 1994, Maryland Film Office chief Jack Gerbes was approached with the possibility of making the film in Baltimore. In October 1998, screenwriter Robin Swicord wrote for director Ron Howard an adapted screenplay of the short story, a project which would potentially star actor John Travolta. In May 2000, Paramount hired screenwriter Jim Taylor to adapt a screenplay from the short story. The studio also attached director Spike Jonze to helm the project. Screenwriter Charlie Kaufman had also written a draft of the adapted screenplay at one point. In June 2003, director Gary Ross entered final negotiations to helm the project based on a new draft penned by screenwriter Eric Roth. In May 2004, director David Fincher entered negotiations to replace Ross in directing the film.

Casting
In May 2005, Brad Pitt and Cate Blanchett entered negotiations to star in the film. In September 2006, Tilda Swinton, Jason Flemyng and Taraji P. Henson entered negotiations to be cast into the film. The following October, with production yet to begin, Julia Ormond was cast as Daisy's daughter, to whom Blanchett's character tells the story of her love for Benjamin Button. Brad Pitt had collaborated with many of his co-stars in previous films. He co-starred with Ormond in Legends of the Fall, with Flemyng in Snatch, with Jared Harris in Ocean's Twelve, with Blanchett in Babel and with Swinton in Burn After Reading.

Filming

For Benjamin Button, New Orleans, Louisiana and the surrounding area was chosen as the filming location for the story to take advantage of the state's production incentives, and shooting was slated to begin in October 2006. By filming in Louisiana and taking advantage of the state's film incentive, the production received $27 million, which was used to finance a significant portion of the film's $167 million budget. Filming of Benjamin Button began on November 6, 2006 in New Orleans. In January 2007, Blanchett joined the shoot. Fincher praised the ease of accessibility to rural and urban sets in New Orleans and said that the recovery from Hurricane Katrina did not serve as an atypical hindrance to production.

In March 2007, production moved to Los Angeles for two more months of filming. Principal photography was targeted to last a total of 150 days. Additional time was needed at visual effects house Digital Domain to make the visual effects for the metamorphosis of Brad Pitt's character to the infant stage. The director used a camera system called Contour, developed by Steve Perlman, to capture facial deformation data from live-action performances.
 
Several digital environments for the film were created by Matte World Digital, including multiple shots of the interior of the New Orleans train station, to show architectural alterations and deterioration throughout different eras. The train station was built as a 3D model and lighting and aging effects were added, using Next Limit's Maxwell rendering software—an architectural visualization tool. Overall production was finished in September 2007.

Music

The score to The Curious Case of Benjamin Button was written by French composer Alexandre Desplat, who recorded his score with an 87-piece ensemble of the Hollywood Studio Symphony at the Sony Scoring Stage.

Release
The Curious Case of Benjamin Button was originally slated for theatrical release in May 2008, but it was pushed back to November 26, 2008. The release date was moved again to December 25 in the United States, January 16, 2009 in Mexico, February 6 in the United Kingdom, February 13 in Italy and February 27 in South Africa.

Box office
On its opening day, the film opened in the number two position behind Marley & Me, in North America with $11,871,831 in 2,988 theaters with a $3,973 average. However, during its opening weekend, the film dropped to the third position behind Marley & Me and Bedtime Stories with $26,853,816 in 2,988 theaters with an $8,987 average. The film has come to gross $127.5 million domestically and $208.3 million in foreign markets, with a total gross of $335.8 million.

Home media
The film was released on DVD on May 5, 2009 by Paramount Home Entertainment, and on Blu-ray and 2-Disc DVD by The Criterion Collection. The Criterion release includes over three hours of special features, and a documentary about the making of the film.

As of November 1, 2009, the film had sold 2,515,722 DVD copies and had generated $41,196,515 in sales revenue.

Reception

Critical response
The review aggregator Rotten Tomatoes reports that 71% of critics gave the film positive reviews based on 258 reviews, with an average rating of 7.10/10. The consensus reads: "Curious Case of Benjamin Button is an epic fantasy tale with rich storytelling backed by fantastic performances." On Metacritic, the film has a weighted average score of 70 out of 100, based on 37 reviews. Yahoo! Movies reported the film received a B+ average score from critical consensus, based on 12 reviews. Audiences surveyed by CinemaScore gave the film a grade A− on scale of A to F. 

Todd McCarthy of Variety magazine gave the film a positive review, calling it a "richly satisfying serving of deep-dish Hollywood storytelling." Peter Howell of The Toronto Star says: "It's been said that the unexamined life is not worth living. The Curious Case of Benjamin Button suggests an addendum: a life lived backwards can be far more enriching" and describes the film as "a magical and moving account of a man living his life resoundingly in reverse" and "moviemaking at its best." Rod Yates of Empire awarded it five out of a possible five stars. Kirk Honeycutt of The Hollywood Reporter felt the film was "superbly made and winningly acted by Brad Pitt in his most impressive outing to date." Honeycutt praised Fincher's directing of the film and noted that the "cinematography wonderfully marries a palette of subdued earthen colors with the necessary CGI and other visual effects that place one in a magical past." Honeycutt states the bottom line about Benjamin Button is that it is "an intimate epic about love and loss that is pure cinema."

A. O. Scott of The New York Times states: "The Curious Case of Benjamin Button, more than two and a half hours long, sighs with longing and simmers with intrigue while investigating the philosophical conundrums and emotional paradoxes of its protagonist’s condition in a spirit that owes more to Jorge Luis Borges than to Fitzgerald." Scott praised Fincher and writes "Building on the advances of pioneers like Steven Spielberg, Peter Jackson and Robert Zemeckis, Mr. Fincher has added a dimension of delicacy and grace to digital filmmaking" and further states: "While it stands on the shoulders of breakthroughs like Minority Report, The Lord of the Rings and Forrest Gump, Benjamin Button may be the most dazzling such hybrid yet, precisely because it is the subtlest." He also stated: "At the same time, like any other love—like any movie—it is shadowed by disappointment and fated to end."

On the other hand, Anne Hornaday of The Washington Post states: "There's no denying the sheer ambition and technical prowess of The Curious Case of Benjamin Button. What's less clear is whether it entirely earns its own inflated sense of self-importance" and further says, "It plays too safe when it should be letting its freak flag fly." Kimberley Jones of the Austin Chronicle panned the film and stated, "Fincher's selling us cheekboned movie stars frolicking in bedsheets and calling it a great love. I didn't buy it for a second." Roger Ebert of the Chicago Sun-Times gave the film two and a half stars out of four, saying that it is "a splendidly made film based on a profoundly mistaken premise. ... the movie's premise devalues any relationship, makes futile any friendship or romance, and spits, not into the face of destiny, but backward into the maw of time."

Peter Bradshaw in The Guardian called it "166 minutes of twee tedium", giving it one star out of five. Cosmo Landesman of the Sunday Times gave the film two out of five stars, writing: "The film's premise serves no purpose. It's a gimmick that goes on for nearly three hours ... The Curious Case of Benjamin Button is an anodyne Hollywood film that offers a safe and sanitised view of life and death." James Christopher in The Times called it "a tedious marathon of smoke and mirrors. In terms of the basic requirements of three-reel drama the film lacks substance, credibility, a decent script and characters you might actually care for." Derek Malcolm of London's Evening Standard felt that "never at any point do you feel that there's anything more to it than a very strange story traversed by a film-maker who knows what he is doing but not always why he is doing it."

Accolades

At the Academy Awards the film won in three categories: Best Achievement in Art Direction, Best Achievement in Makeup, and Best Achievement in Visual Effects. It was also nominated in ten other categories: Best Motion Picture of the Year, Best Performance by an Actor in a Leading Role, Best Performance by an Actress in a Supporting Role, Best Achievement in Directing, Best Writing, Adapted Screenplay, Best Achievement in Cinematography, Best Achievement in Film Editing, Best Achievement in Costume Design, Best Achievement in Music Written for Motion Pictures, Original Score, and Best Achievement in Sound Mixing.

Taraji P. Henson won Best Actress at the BET Awards for her role in the film combined with two other performances in Not Easily Broken, and The Family That Preys.

The film won all four awards it was nominated for at the 7th Visual Effects Society Awards, the categories of "Outstanding Visual Effects in a Visual Effects-Driven Feature Motion Picture," "Best Single Visual Effect of the Year," "Outstanding Animated Character in a Live Action Feature Motion Picture," and "Outstanding Compositing in a Feature Motion Picture."

See also
 De-aging in film

References

External links

 
 
 
 
 The Curious Case of Benjamin Button: The Man Who Watched the Hours Go By an essay by Kent Jones at the Criterion Collection

2008 romantic drama films
2000s romantic fantasy films
2008 films
American historical romance films
American romantic drama films
American romantic fantasy films
BAFTA winners (films)
2000s English-language films
2000s fantasy drama films
Films based on short fiction
Films based on works by F. Scott Fitzgerald
Films directed by David Fincher
Films produced by Frank Marshall
Films produced by Kathleen Kennedy
Films scored by Alexandre Desplat
Films set in Florida
Films set in India
Films set in New Orleans
Films set in New York City
Films set in Paris
Films set in Russia
Films set in the 1910s
Films set in 1918
Films set in the 1920s
Films set in 1925
Films set in the 1930s
Films set in 1930
Films set in 1936
Films set in the 1940s
Films set in 1941
Films set in 1945
Films set in 1954
Films set in the 1960s
Films set in 1962
Films set in 1968
Films set in the 1970s
Films set in 1970
Films set in the 1980s
Films set in 1981
Films set in the 1990s
Films set in 1991
Films set in 1997
Films set in the 2000s
Films set in 2002
Films set in 2003
Films set in 2005
Films shot in Los Angeles
Films shot in Montreal
Films shot in New Orleans
Films shot in the United States Virgin Islands
Films that won the Academy Award for Best Makeup
Films that won the Best Visual Effects Academy Award
Films whose art director won the Best Art Direction Academy Award
Films shot in India
The Kennedy/Marshall Company films
Films using motion capture
Films with screenplays by Eric Roth
Films with screenplays by Robin Swicord
Historical fantasy films
Magic realism films
Paramount Pictures films
Warner Bros. films
World War II naval films
Hurricane Katrina
Cultural depictions of Theodore Roosevelt
Films about mother–son relationships
Films about father–son relationships
Films about mother–daughter relationships
2000s American films